The Tuscola Intermediate School District (Tuscola ISD) is an intermediate school district in Michigan, headquartered in Caro.

Most of Tuscola County is served by the Tuscola Intermediate School District, which coordinates the efforts of local boards of education, but has no operating authority over schools. Local school boards in Michigan retain great autonomy over day-to-day operations.

Governance
The Tuscola Intermediate School District is governed by a publicly elected board of education, who is responsible for hiring a superintendent.

Composition
The Tuscola Intermediate School District includes public school districts and non-public schools.

Public school districts
As of the 2015-2016 school year, the communities of Tuscola County are served by the following members of the Tuscola Intermediate School District:
 Akron-Fairgrove Schools
 Caro Community Schools
 Cass City Public Schools
 Kingston Community Schools
 Mayville Community Schools
 Millington Community Schools
 Reese Public Schools
 Unionville-Sebewaing Area Schools
 Vassar Public Schools

Non-public schools
The Tuscola Intermediate School District includes non-public schools, including Deford Christian Academy and Juniata Christian School.

See also
 List of intermediate school districts in Michigan

References

External links
 

Education in Tuscola County, Michigan
Intermediate school districts in Michigan